Heart Signal (Korean: 하트시그널) is a South Korean dating reality television show distributed by Channel A. Season 1 of the show aired in 2017, followed by season 2 in 2018 and season 3 in 2020. Based on the cast members of Heart Signal, a new program named Friends was also produced.

Overview 
The reality show follows eight people living together for one month as they get to know each other and go on dates. Every night, each cast member sends an anonymous text message to another cast member to show their romantic interest. However, they are not allowed to directly confess their love. Meanwhile, a panel of celebrities and experts watches the show, analyzing the cast members' actions and trying to predict who will text who.

Panelists 

Season 1
 Yoon Jong-shin
 Lee Sang-min
 Kim Eana
 Yang Jae-woong
 Shim So-young
 Shindong (Super Junior)

Season 2<ref>{{Cite web|last=|first=|date=March 15, 2018|title=[현장]'하트시그널2' 윤종신, '소유·원이 '감각'이라면 나와 이상민은 '바람|url=https://www.sedaily.com/NewsView/1RWZMHIXNQ/GL0103|url-status=live|archive-url=|archive-date=|access-date=October 27, 2020|website=Seoul Economic Daily|language=ko}}</ref>
 Yoon Jong-shin
 Lee Sang-min
 Kim Eana
 Yang Jae-woong
 ONE
 Soyou

Season 3
 Lee Sang-min
 Kim Eana
 Yang Jae-woong
 Han Hye-jin
 Yoon Shi-yoon
 P.O (Block B)

 Cast members 
Season 1

Season 2

Season 3

 Controversies 
Season 1

In 2019, Heart Signal cast member Kang Sung-wook was sentenced to five years in prison for sexually assaulting a woman in August 2017. Fellow cast member Jang Cheon reportedly initially served as Kang's lawyer in the case but resigned after six days. Kang's sentence was reduced to 30 months in prison in 2020.

Season 2Heart Signal 2 cast member Kim Hyun-woo was arrested for drunk driving in April 2018 while the show was airing.

Season 3

After the cast members of Heart Signal 3'' were publicly announced, a woman accused cast member Lee Ga-heun of bullying classmates. Cast member Cheon An-na was also accused of bullying. The show's producers denied the allegations.

While the show was airing, another woman told the media that cast member Kim Kang-yeol had kicked her in the stomach at a nightclub in January 2017. Kim admitted to the incident and apologized on social media.

References

External links 
 Official Website

Channel A (TV channel) original programming
South Korean variety television shows
South Korean dating and relationship reality television series